"", officially called the National Anthem (State Anthem), is the national anthem of Myanmar. It consists of two parts; the first half is a traditional Burmese style section, before transitioning into the second half, a Western-style orchestra.

A long-standing tradition is that those who sing the national anthem bow at the end, as a show of respect for the nation.

History
Pre-colonial Burma did not have a proper national anthem, but had compositions glorifying the king, which served as royal anthems. After the annexation of Burma by the British Raj in 1886, "God Save the King" became the national anthem of British Burma.

In 1930, a musician from Mandalay named Saya Tin went to Rangoon and contacted the Thakins to write a new national anthem together. They set four criteria for the anthem: it must include the background of Burmese history; the current situation of Burma with regrets, lessons, and then encouraging words; it must agitate Burmese habits to build a new age; and the anthem must agitate national pride of any Burmese who listens to it. For these criteria to be met, many Thakins including Thakin Ba Thaung, Thakin Thein Maung, Thakin Hla Baw, Thakin Tha Do, Thakin One Pe, Thakin Kyaw Tun Sein, and Thakin Po Ni helped find words, and YMB Saya Tin wrote the lyrics originally titled "Dobama Song". Besides being the leader of the Thakins, Thakin Ba Thaung was working as a teacher of translation at Rangoon University. He had a discussion with U Tun Sein, a tutor of mathematics; U Nyunt, a tutor of Burmese; and Ko Nu, a student. On 19 July 1930, the Dobama Song was sung for the first time in a reading room of Thaton Hostel. Written in Burmese and English, it was published in the University Magazine. On 20 July 1930, it was sung with a ceremony with a huge public crowd inside U San Tun Hall at the Rahu corner of Shwedagon Pagoda. On 21 July 1930 in the Thuriya (The Sun) newspaper, a request to sing the Dobama Song again for those who had not listened appeared. After that the Dobama Asiayone received a lot of invitations to come and sing the song. The Thakins tried to establish a tradition of singing Dobama Song in every meeting and ceremony.

The State of Burma, a Japanese puppet state, officially adopted the Dobama Song as the national anthem in 1943.

In the lead up to Burma's independence, U Nu asked U Sein Mya Maung to write a national anthem for their soon-to-be independent country. U Sein Mya Maung used the Dobama Song as a template, keeping the song's melody but slightly modifying the lyrics. The National Anthem was adopted as Burma's national anthem on 22 September 1947.

In fact, both words mean either Burma (Myanmar) or Burman (Bamar).

According to the 2008 Constitution of Myanmar, the complete version of the national anthem is specified as consisting of both the traditional Burmese style and Western-style sections.

Lyrics

Burmese lyrics

English translation

Notes

References

External links

 Burma/Myanmar: Kaba Ma Kyei - Audio of the national anthem of Burma/Myanmar, with information and lyrics (archive link)
 Ga Ba Majay Ba Ma Pyay (MIDI file)
 Sheet music (from Embassy of Burma to Washington)

Burmese music
Asian anthems
National symbols of Myanmar
1947 compositions
National anthem compositions in A-flat major